Terri Bryant is a Republican member of the Illinois Senate from the 58th district. Previously, she was a member of the Illinois House of Representatives representing the 115th district from 2015 until 2021. She took office two weeks earlier than the majority of the 2015 freshman class when her predecessor Mike Bost resigned early in order to take office in Congress. The 115th district, located in Southern Illinois, includes Jefferson, Washington, Perry, Jackson and Union counties.

Bryant was a public administrator with the Illinois Department of Corrections prior to her tenure as a State Representative.

Bryant announced she would run for the Illinois Senate in 2020 to succeed fellow Republican Paul Schimpf. She was elected to the Illinois Senate and succeeded in the House by fellow Republican Paul Jacobs.

She serves on the following committees: Behavioral and Mental Health (Minority Spokesperson); Agriculture; Education; Ethics; Executive Appointments; Health; Tourism and Hospitality; Subcommittee on Children & Family; Sub. on Long-Term Care & Aging; Redistricting- Southern Illinois.

References

External links
Official Illinois General Assembly website
Terri Bryant for State Representative campaign website
Terri Bryant at Ballotpedia

Living people
People from Murphysboro, Illinois
Republican Party members of the Illinois House of Representatives
Women state legislators in Illinois
21st-century American politicians
21st-century American women politicians
1963 births